Patriotas Boyacá, also known as Patriotas, is a professional Colombian football team based in Tunja, that currently plays in the Categoría Primera B. They play their home games at the La Independencia stadium.

History
Patriotas was founded in 2003 by the then-governor of Boyacá Miguel Ángel Bermúdez, together with the then Coldeportes chairman and the owners of hardware business G&J. In its first year in the Primera B, the club reached the semifinals, where it was eliminated by Bogotá Chicó.

In 2004 the team again advanced to the semifinals, where the team played against Deportivo Antioquia, Centauros Villavicencio and Expreso Rojo, but did not qualify. In 2005 Patriotas was second in the general table but in the semifinals was eliminated by Bajo Cauca F.C. In 2009 some changes were implemented in the tournament. Patriotas was first in Group B but was eliminated again in the semifinals and ended up in third place.

In 2011 the team was promoted to the Categoría Primera A after beating América de Cali by penalties in the promotion/relegation playoff. In 2016, the team qualified for the final stages of the top tier for the first time, after placing eighth in the first stage. That year, the team also managed to qualify for the 2017 Copa Sudamericana, which was the first participation of the team in an international competition, reaching the second stage.

Patriotas's first spell in Primera A lasted 10 years as they were relegated back to Primera B at the end of the 2022 season, sealing their relegation on 16 October 2022 with two matches to go in the first stage of the 2022 Finalización tournament after a scoreless draw with Millonarios and a victory for Unión Magdalena against Deportivo Pereira, which ensured the team would end the season in the bottom two places of the relegation table.

Honours
Categoría Primera B:
Runners-up (1): 2011

Performance in CONMEBOL competitions

Players

Current squad

Out on loan

Managers

Source: Worldfootball.net

References

External links

 Official Team Site
 Unofficial Fan Site

 
Football clubs in Colombia
Association football clubs established in 2003
2003 establishments in Colombia
Categoría Primera A clubs
Categoría Primera B clubs